Anjali is a 1990 Indian Tamil-language children's drama film written and directed by Mani Ratnam. It stars Raghuvaran and Revathi, with Tarun, Shruti and Shamili in supporting roles. The film deals with the story of a dying mentally disabled child, and the emotional trauma experienced by her family. 

Anjali was released on 12 July 1990 and was critically acclaimed, winning three National Film Awards, and was also featured at the 14th IFFI' 91 Indian Panorama section. Anjali was chosen as India's official entry to the Oscars in 1991, but was not nominated. The film was remade in Sinhala in 2013 as Doni.

Plot 
Civil engineer Shekhar lives with his wife Chitra and their two young children Arjun and Anu. Chitra delivers a third child, but the daughter is claimed to be stillborn. Two years later, Shekar and his family move to a new apartment complex. The family seems to have moved on from their grief due to the stillborn child incident and live happily. After a few altercations with the kids in the colony, Arjun and Anu are accepted by all the kids as their own. The kids are all for pulling pranks and generally causing a clamour around the apartment colony. One such constant joke, they play on a mentally disabled ex-watchman of the colony, much to the chagrin of his wife. The only tenant they are afraid of is Dennis Joseph, an ex-convict, who lives alone in one of the apartments.

On one particular day, Chitra and the kids decided to surprise Shekhar by meeting him at his construction area, unannounced. Nevertheless, on coming to the site, they learned from one of the construction workers that Shekhar has left to conduct an emergency matter elsewhere. When Shekhar returns home for dinner that night, Chitra casually asks him where he was on that day, to which he replies that he was at the construction site the whole day.  Chitra feels hurt to hear Shekhar lying and leaves the dining hall. Arjun and Anu too sense that their father is lying to them and leave the place. Nevertheless, before leaving the room, Anu blurts out accusations on her father, saying that he's lying about being at the site the whole day. Shekhar apologises to Chitra and consoles her and they both make up.

On New Year's Eve, Arjun slips out late at night with the older children to celebrate while Shekhar is out of town on a business trip. Nevertheless, while dancing with his friends on the road, Arjun sees Shekhar with another woman and is shocked to know that his father has lied to them about going out of the town. Later, Arjun and the other children are hauled by the police back to their homes. Chitra is furious to learn about Arjun's escapade and when Shekhar comes back, asks him to punish Arjun.  While Shekhar inquires him about the incident, Arjun, who was still angry at his father, blurts out that he saw Shekhar with another woman on New Year's Eve. Chitra and Anu become shocked on hearing about the incident. Chitra then starts suspecting that Shekhar is having affair with another woman and confronts him about it, but Shekhar swears on both his kids that he is not.

A few days later, while on the bus, Chitra spots Shekhar talking to a woman. She gets out of the bus and confronts him. Without waiting for his explanations, she rushes back home, packs her bags and threatens to walk out of the house with her kids. Shekhar pleads her to stay but she doesn't stop. Finally, Shekhar comes clean.

Their third child, Anjali, was born mentally ill and with a terminal illness a few years ago. The doctors did not give the child more than a couple of months to live. To avoid the sadness for a couple of months from an already physically exhausted Chitra and to protect his children from the trauma, he colludes with the doctors to lie to his family that the child was stillborn. But much to the surprise of everyone, the child has made it past her second birthday and is seemingly physically healthy. The woman Shekar was talking to is Anjali's doctor Sheela. Although Chitra is saddened by this betrayal, she decides to bring Anjali back home.

Anjali is not like a normal child and requires constant attention from both the parents. This causes the other two siblings to dislike Anjali. Moreover, the other kids in the colony and school tease them by making fun of Anjali's condition. One day, the other kids in the colony make fun of Anjali by tying a string of cans behind her. This causes Arjun to fight with the other kids. He gets bruised which saddens Anjali, but a special bond is born between the siblings. Arjun becomes protective of her and challenges the other kids in the colony to a fight if they can't accept her. The kids accept Anjali and all the kids come to love her.

This causes the parents of the kids to worry as they don't want their kids to be close with a mentally disabled child. During an apartment association meeting, the parents of the kids demand that Shekar and Chitra either leave the apartment or institutionalise Anjali. The only person to argue for Anjali's presence is Dennis. The parents are afraid of him and let it go. But soon, Anjali wins over everyone in the apartment complex and everyone comes to like her.

Meanwhile, Shekhar, during a late-night visit to his construction site with Chitra and Anjali, he witnesses a murder. He reports this to the police and the murderer is arrested. The murderer is enraged and visits Shekar's house after getting out on bail. He physically assaults and plans on killing Shekhar. But Dennis comes to the rescue and kills the murderer in the altercation when he threatens Shekhar's family and is arrested.  Dennis thanks Shekhar before leaving as Anjali was the only person to show compassion to him.

The next morning, Anu goes to wake up Anjali. When Anjali doesn't wake up, she calls Arjun and her parents, who realise that she has died in her sleep. As more and more people come after hearing Anu's screams, they all are saddened by the demise of the girl who taught them acceptance and forgiveness.

Cast 

 Raghuvaran as Shekar
 Revathi as Chitra
 Prabhu as Dennis Joseph (cameo)
 Saranya as Doctor Sheela (cameo)
 Nishanti (special appearance in the song "Iravu Nilavu")
 Tarun as Arjun
 Shruti as Anu
 Shamili as Anjali
 V. K. Ramasamy as Umapathi
 Poornam Viswanathan as Narayanaswamy
 Charuhasan as the apartment colony head
 Janagaraj as the watchman
 Oruviral Krishnarao
 Pradeep Shakthi
 Ananthu
 Charle as a police officer
 Thyagu
 Babu Antony as Dharma
 Anand (Special appearance in the song "Motta Maadi")
 Gayathri (Special appearance in the song "Motta Maadi")
 Anand as Anjali's friend
 Chethan Cheenu (uncredited) as Arjun's rival

Production

Development 
The idea of Anjali was developed by Mani Ratnam during the making of Nayakan (1987). He initially approached Dennis Joseph to have the screenplay for Anjali written. Being a fan of Ratnam's work, Dennis Joseph agreed to write but as months went by he could not work on it due to other commitments. Eventually, Ratnam decided to write the film himself. Anjali was also Ratnam's first film since Mouna Ragam (1986) without P. C. Sreeram as cinematographer, for which he used Madhu Ambat instead. Ambat said he agreed to work on the film because he liked Ratnam's earlier work. B. Lenin and V. T. Vijayan served as editors.

Casting and filming 
Mohan was originally considered for playing the male lead, but he refused as he believed his fans would not accept seeing him as "the father of two kids". The role later went to Raghuvaran. Shamili was three years old while doing this film. The crew had difficulty to get the character right for her, so they found the solution by recording videos of a special child. Shamili's father put in a lot of effort and he would make her watch every day to observe the actions of the child. Prabhu's character was named after named after Dennis Joseph. Playback singer Pop Shalini was offered the role of Anjali's sister but her mother refused the role as not to affect her education.

Soundtrack 
The soundtrack was composed by Ilaiyaraaja and lyrics by Vaali. It is Ilaiyaraaja's 500th film as a composer. For the Telugu dubbed version, all the lyrics are written by Rajasri. For the Hindi dubbed version, all lyrics were written by Sameer.

Release and reception 

Anjali was released on 12 July 1990 by GV Films. The following day, N. Krishnaswamy wrote for The Indian Express that "directing so many kids must have been such a difficult task ... and [Mani Ratnam] has been so successful in this department." On 5 August 1990, Ananda Vikatan overwhelmingly appreciated the film, rating it 58 out of 100. It was noted to be inspired by the 1979 televised docudrama Son-Rise: A Miracle of Love.

A Telugu dubbed version was released later that year. After the success of the Hindi dubbed version of Roja (1992), this film was dubbed in Hindi in 1993.

Accolades 
Anjali was chosen as India's official entry to the Oscars in 1991, but was not nominated. It was screened at the International Film Festival of India along with Sandhya Raagam (1990) as the only two Tamil films as part of Indian Panorama.

See also 
 List of submissions to the 63rd Academy Awards for Best Foreign Language Film

References

Bibliography

External links 
 

1990 films
1990s children's drama films
1990s Tamil-language films
Best Tamil Feature Film National Film Award winners
Films about autism
Films about disability in India
Films directed by Mani Ratnam
Films scored by Ilaiyaraaja
Films that won the Best Audiography National Film Award
Indian children's drama films
Tamil films remade in other languages